LTK may refer to the
LTK Commune
Leukocyte receptor tyrosine kinase, in biochemistry, a member of the receptor tyrosine kinase family of cell surface receptors 
Bassel Al-Assad International Airport, the airport of Latakia, Syria (IATA code).
Licence to Kill, 1989 James Bond film
LIKEtoKNOW.it, shopping app which became LTK in 2021
Little Kimble railway station, England; National Rail station code LTK
Legends of the Three Kingdoms, a Chinese popular card game based on the Three Kingdoms period of China and the semi-fictional novel Romance of the Three Kingdoms (ROTK).